The Scatterville Cemetery is a historic cemetery in rural Clay County, Arkansas. The cemetery has thirty marked graves, although county records indicate there were at least 52. The earliest burial dates to 1857, with most occurring in the 1870s. The cemetery is all that remains of the community of Scatterville, an antebellum community which was bypassed by the railroad, and whose inhabitants probably migrated to Rector.

The cemetery was listed on the National Register of Historic Places in 1995.

See also
National Register of Historic Places listings in Clay County, Arkansas

References

External links

Cemeteries on the National Register of Historic Places in Arkansas
Clay County, Arkansas
National Register of Historic Places in Clay County, Arkansas
1857 establishments in Arkansas
Cemeteries established in the 1850s